Whitehall Mall is a shopping mall located in Whitehall, Pennsylvania. It is anchored by Kohl's. Whitehall Mall was one of the Lehigh Valley's first malls and is located across from the Lehigh Valley Mall.

History

1966-1997
Land for the mall was purchased for $125,000 from a farmer and groundbreaking occurred in 1965. Zollinger's opened before the mall on August 15, 1966, with the rest of the mall opening on September 26, 1966. The mall had 52 stores including Sears, Weis Markets, Woolworth's, and Zollinger's. Whitehall Mall expanded in 1973, and in 1978 Leh's opened, replacing the closed (bankrupt) Zollinger's. Kravco become co-owner of the mall with PREIT in 1977 for 4.5 million. Clover opened in March 1982. Sears interior underwent a major overhaul in 1984. The mall received a lowered tax assessment after settling with the county, township, and school district in 1985.

In 1987, a suspicious fire started in the back of the mall that later caused a wall of the Leh's to be demolished. Sears interior underwent another overhaul in 1994 that added 35,000 sq. ft. to the sales floor, and converted the former second floor offices to store space. Several stores suffered damage due to a large roof leak in January 1990, with all stores reopening after a few days, and the roofs replacement planned for April. Leh's closed in June 1996 due to bankruptcy, with Gallery Furniture taking over its former space in 1997. Clover closed in 1996, with its replacement Kohl's opening in April 1997.

1998–present

Whitehall Mall received a $15 million renovation in 1998, where it was almost totally demalled, except for a portion near Kohl's. Retaining the traditional mall look was determined to not be cost effective. Sears was expanded during this time. Three additional buildings were added to the mall's grounds during the renovation. Weis Markets closed during renovations that almost doubled its space. Plaza Theater closed in June 1999 due to having only two screens and being obsolete. The theater was previously operated by Budco, and by AMC from 1987-1996. The opening of Gold's Gym in the mid 2000s was delayed due to design changes. Gold's Gym would use the former Leh's store and Plaza Theater. Raymour & Flanigan relocated to the mall in 2012, occupying two vacant storefronts. PREIT sold its 50% ownership of the Whitehall Mall in 2014 to Washington Prime Group, the mall's other owner. Sears closed in February 2020. PA Fitness (former Gold’s Gym) closed in January 2022.

Notes

References

External links

CBRE Whitehall Mall
Washington Prime Group Whitehall Mall

1966 establishments in Pennsylvania
Buildings and structures in Lehigh County, Pennsylvania
Shopping malls established in 1966
Shopping malls in Lehigh County, Pennsylvania
Tourist attractions in Lehigh County, Pennsylvania
Washington Prime Group